Death at Dyke's Corner is a 1940 detective novel  by E.C.R. Lorac, the pen name of the British writer Edith Caroline Rivett. It is the nineteenth in her long-running series featuring Chief Inspector MacDonald of Scotland Yard, a Golden Age detective who relies on standard police procedure to solve his cases.

Synopsis
When a stationary car is struck by an oncoming lorry at a very dangerous hairpin bend known as Dyke's Corner and the driver killed it seems an obvious accident. However, MacDonald's methodical investigations reveal it was in fact a cleverly contrived murder.

References

Bibliography
 Cooper, John & Pike, B.A. Artists in Crime: An Illustrated Survey of Crime Fiction First Edition Dustwrappers, 1920-1970. Scolar Press, 1995.
 Hubin, Allen J. Crime Fiction, 1749-1980: A Comprehensive Bibliography. Garland Publishing, 1984.
 Nichols, Victoria & Thompson, Susan. Silk Stalkings: More Women Write of Murder. Scarecrow Press, 1998.
 Reilly, John M. Twentieth Century Crime & Mystery Writers. Springer, 2015.

1940 British novels
British mystery novels
Novels by E.C.R. Lorac
Novels set in England
British detective novels
Collins Crime Club books